Nariaki (written: 斉昭 or 成彬) is a masculine Japanese given name. Notable people with the name include:

 (born on 1943), Japanese politician
 (1800–1860), Japanese daimyō

Japanese masculine given names